"Fest i hela huset" is a song by Swedish musician Basshunter, recorded during the Swedish edition of the reality television series Big Brother. It was released as a single on 20 April 2011 by Warner Music Sweden. It was written by Basshunter, Simon Danielsson, Gurkan Gasi, Sara Jönsson and Sonia Kamau, with Basshunter being responsible for the production. In 2013, it was released as part of Basshunter's studio album Calling Time. The song peaked at number 5 on the Swedish singles chart.

Description 
"Fest i hela huset" is two minutes and 50 seconds long, and was created by Basshunter and participants of the Swedish edition of Big Brother. The song was written by Basshunter, Simon Danielsson, Gurkan Gasi, Sara Jönsson and Sonia Kamau. Basshunter was responsible for the production.

Release
Basshunter's previous single, "Saturday", was released on 5 July 2010.  On 8 April 2011 it was announced that Basshunter would appear on the Swedish edition of the reality television series Big Brother, to record a song, saying that he is a fan of Big Brother's format. Basshunter's manager Henrik Uhlmann noted that the project would require Basshunter to make the best of the special conditions associated with producing a song within the Big Brother house. Basshunter entered the Big Brother house on 11 April and identified Gurkan Gasi as an "obvious" candidate to sing, with the assignment room being transformed into a studio. None of the contestants had played music professionally. Basshunter conducted auditions with the contestants, and asked them about their creativity, strengths and weaknesses. The contestants impressed Basshunter, who did not have high hopes, but had enough material for a song after auditioning half of the group. Basshunter selected the contestants who would sing, with the song being scheduled to be released on 14 April.

On 12 April the working title of the song, "Fest i hela huset" was revealed. The Big Brother episode featuring Basshunter was watched by 202,000 viewers, an increase of 20,000 compared to the previous week. The song premiered on 17 April. The organizers wanted Basshunter to appear at the premiere in the Big Brother house, but this did not happen. One of the vocalists, Annie Almén, praised the song's danceable beat. Press officer at Big Brother, Erik Sidung said that was great fun. The song was released on 20 April by Warner Music Sweden. On 23 May, a 3-track single with an instrumental version and a ClubKid remix were released. On 30 March 2012, the Top Cats released the single "Sad But True", which also featured Big Brother contestants, however, unlike Basshunter's song, the contestants only performed as backup singers for the Top Cats. "Northern Light" was the next Basshunter single, released on 21 May. On 13 May 2013, "Fest i hela huset" was released as part of Basshunter's studio album Calling Time.

Chart performance
On 6 May 2011 "Fest i hela huset" entered the Swedish singles chart at number 16, climbing to number 9 the following week, two more weeks at number 7 and eventually peaking at number 5.

Track listing

Charts

Weekly charts

Year-end charts

Release history

Notes

References

External links
 

2011 songs
2011 singles
Basshunter songs
Songs written by Basshunter
Song recordings produced by Basshunter
Big Brother (Swedish TV series)
Warner Music Sweden singles
Swedish-language songs